The bacterial SroC RNA is a non-coding RNA gene of around 160 nucleotides in length. SroC is found in several enterobacterial species.  This RNA interacts with the Hfq protein.

SroC acts as a ‘sponge,’ and base pairs with and regulates activity of the sRNA GcvB. This interaction triggers the degradation of GcvB by RNase E, alleviating the GcvB-mediated mRNA repression of other amino acid-related transport and metabolic genes.

References

External links 
 

Non-coding RNA